Nosh may refer to:

 NOSH-aspirin, a category of new hybrids of aspirin
 Farah Nosh, Iraqi-Canadian photojournalist
 Nosh A Lody (born 1989), Finnish footballer of Congolese descent
 The Nosh Bar, London salt beef bar

See also
 Nosher (disambiguation)